María Cecilia Colombo de Serrano (born February 14, 1962) is a retired female field hockey defender from Argentina. She was a member of the Women's National Team that finished in seventh place at the 1988 Summer Olympics in Seoul, South Korea after having won the gold medal the previous year at the Pan American Games in Indianapolis.

International tournaments 
 1983 World Cup in Malaysia
 1986 World Cup in Amsterdam
 1987 Pan American Games in USA
 1988 Summer Olympics in Seoul

References 
  sports-reference
  santafedeportivo

External links
 

1962 births
Living people
Argentine female field hockey players
Las Leonas players
Field hockey players at the 1988 Summer Olympics
Olympic field hockey players of Argentina
Pan American Games gold medalists for Argentina
Pan American Games medalists in field hockey
Field hockey players at the 1987 Pan American Games
Medalists at the 1987 Pan American Games